Meyerson Hall is a building in West Philadelphia, and the site of the University of Pennsylvania Stuart Weitzman School of Design. It is named for Martin Meyerson, President of the University of Pennsylvania from 1970 to 1981.

Meyerson Hall is located at the corner of Walnut Street and South 34th Street in University City, Philadelphia, Pennsylvania. Immediately adjacent to the south is the Fisher Fine Arts Library, designed by Frank Furness and completed in 1890. Immediately to the west is the College Green, the heart of the University.

The building currently houses the main offices of the following departments of the School of Design: Architecture, Landscape Architecture, Historic Preservation, and City and Regional Planning. Fine Arts is the only department in the school not housed in Meyerson, and is located across 34th St. in the Morgan Building.

The Basement contains the newly opened PennDesign Cafe, eight lecture halls, custodial staff support spaces, and the materials library.
The Ground Floor contains the main lobby, Lower Gallery, faculty offices and the Operations and Planning office.
The First Floor contains departmental offices for Landscape Architecture, Preservation, and Urban Planning, Dean's Alley critique space, the Upper Gallery, and offices for the Dean, Alumni Affairs, Admissions, and the Registrar.
The Second Floor contains offices for Architecture, as well as studio space.
The Third Floor contains two computer labs, a plotter room, student lounge (with vending machines), and additional architecture studio space.
The Fourth Floor contains studios for Landscape Architecture and Historic Preservation, the Architectural Conservation Laboratory, the Fabrication Laboratory, and the 4th Floor Hall critique space.

External links
Facilities Information
PennDesign Page

University of Pennsylvania campus
Buildings and structures completed in 1967